Timothy Moon-Yew Chan is a Founder Professor in the Department of Computer Science at the University of Illinois at Urbana–Champaign. He was formerly Professor and University Research Chair
in the David R. Cheriton School of Computer Science, University of Waterloo, Canada.

He graduated with BA (summa cum laude) from Rice University in 1992, and completed his Ph.D. in Computer Science at UBC in 1995 at the age of 19. His late mother, Miu Yung Chan, was a molecular physicist with a Ph.D. from Ohio State University.

He is currently an associate editor for SIAM Journal on Computing
and the International Journal of Computational Geometry and Applications.  He is also a member of the editorial board of Algorithmica,
Discrete & Computational Geometry,
and Computational Geometry: Theory and Applications.

Chan has published extensively. His research covers data structures, algorithms, and computational geometry.

Recognition
He was awarded the Governor General's Gold Medal (as Head of Graduating Class in the Faculty of Graduate Studies at the University of British Columbia during convocation), the NSERC doctoral prize, and the Premier's Research Excellence Award (PREA) of Ontario, Canada.

He was elected as an ACM Fellow in 2019 "for contributions to computational geometry, algorithms, and data structures".

See also
Chan's algorithm, an output-sensitive algorithm for planar convex hulls

References

External links
Chan's web site at University of Illinois at Urbana-Champaign

Living people
University of Illinois Urbana-Champaign faculty
Academic staff of the University of Waterloo
Researchers in geometric algorithms
Rice University alumni
University of British Columbia alumni
1976 births
Fellows of the Association for Computing Machinery